Poisoned cup may refer to:
 a kind of forced suicide
 Trial of Socrates
 Poisoned cup (novel), a novel by Joseph Drew